Nancy Ames (born Nancy Hamilton Alfaro on September 30, 1937) is an American folk singer and songwriter. She regularly appeared on the American version of the television series That Was the Week That Was. The TW3 Girl, as she was known, sang the show theme and special material.

Personal life
Ames was born in Washington, D.C., the granddaughter of Ricardo Joaquín Alfaro, who served as President of Panama from 1931 to 1932.

The daughter of a physician, she grew up in Washington. She attended Holton Arms School and Bennett College, both of them for girls. By 1964, she was married to Romanian hypnotist Triaian Boyer. By 1968, they had divorced. After the divorce, she married Jay Riviere, a golf course designer. They had one child, a daughter, Nancy, but ultimately divorced.
Ames has resided in Houston, Texas since 1972. She and her third husband Danny Ward are the co-founders of Ward & Ames Special Events.

Career

A folk singer with a partially Latin repertoire, Ames was signed to Liberty Records. Her first album was entitled Cu Cu-ru Cu-Cu La Paloma. 

She broke the top 100 twice in 1966; "He Wore the Green Beret", her answer song to Staff Sgt. Barry Sadler's Ballad of the Green Berets, hit number 89 before falling to 96, and later in the year Cry Softly also placed in the charts.

She had a TV show which aired on KPRC-TV Channel 2 (the Houston area NBC affiliate) from 1972-77. She is listed as the co-writer of the theme song to The Smothers Brothers Comedy Hour with Mason Williams per Williams' own 1969 LP entitled Music by Mason Williams. Ames and Williams also co-wrote Cinderella Rockefella, an international pop hit, in 1968.

In the late 70s, Ames moved to Houston, Texas. In 1982 she and her third husband, Danny Ward, founded Ward & Ames, an events and video-production firm. Ames is also the co-founder of the Plumeria Society of America, and owned the jewelry company Alfaro, A Nancy Ames Collection.

US discography (selective)

LPs
 The Incredible Nancy Ames - Liberty – LRP-3276 - (1963)
 A Portrait of Nancy - Liberty – LRP-3299 - (1963)
 I Will Never Marry - Liberty – LRP-3329 - (1963)
 This is the Girl That is - Liberty – LRP-3369 - (1964)
 Let It Be Me - Liberty – LRP-3400 - (1965)
 As Time Goes By - Epic – BN 26197 - (1965)
 Latin Pulse - Epic – BN 26189 - (1966)
 Versatile Nancy Ames - Sunset Records – SUS-5109 - (1966)
 Spiced With Brasil - Epic – LN 24238 - (1967)
 At The Americana - Epic – BN 26378 - (1968)

Singles
7"
 "Bonsoir Cher" / "Cu Cu Rru Cu Cu Paloma" - Liberty – F-55548 - (1963)
 "Malaguena Salarosa" / "Cu Cu Rru Cu Cu Paloma" - Liberty 55737 - (1964)
 "The Funny Thing About It" / "Shake A Hand" - Epic – 5-9845 - (1965)
 "Let Tonight Linger On" / "It Scares Me" - Liberty – F-55762 - (1965)
 "I've Got A Lot Of Love (Left In Me)" / "Friends And Lovers Forever" - Epic 5-9874 - (promo) (1965)
 "He Wore The Green Beret" / "War Is A Card Game" - Epic – 5-10003 - (1966)
 "I Don't Want To Talk About It" / "Cry Softly" - Epic – 5-10056 - (1966)
 "Friends And Lovers Forever" (Billboard Hot 100 #123) / "Dear Hearts And Gentle" - Epic – 5-9885 - (1966)
 "Love's Like Wine" / "My Story Book" - Epic – 5-10149 - (1967)
 "Something's Gotten Hold Of My Heart" / "On Green Dolphin Street" - ABC Records 11100 - (1968)
 "Something's Gotten Hold Of My Heart" / "On Green Dolphin Street" - Silvercloud Records 1001 - (1968)
12"
 Mr. Bongo - "Soul Limbo" / Nancy Ames - "Eso Beso (That Kiss)" - Sony Music Entertainment (UK) – XPR 2213 - (1995)

EP
  "1-2-3", "A Taste Of Honey" / "Call Me", "The Shadow Of Your Smile" - Epic – EP 9053 - (1966)

References

External links

 Ward and Ames Special Events
 
 Nancy Ames at Discogs

1937 births
American folk singers
Singers from Washington, D.C.
American people of Panamanian descent
Spanish-language singers of the United States
Epic Records artists
Liberty Records artists
Living people